The final of the Men's 200 metres Backstroke event at the European LC Championships 1997 was held on Thursday 21 August 1997 in Seville, Spain.

Finals

Qualifying heats

See also
1996 Men's Olympic Games 200m Backstroke
1997 Men's World Championships (SC) 200m Backstroke

References
 scmsom results
 swimrankings
 La Gazzetta Archivio

B